Work of Art, or variations, may refer to:

 Work of art, an aesthetic item or artistic creation

Literature
 Work of Art, a 1934 novel by Sinclair Lewis
 "The Work of Art in the Age of Mechanical Reproduction", a 1935 essay by Walter Benjamin
 "A Work of Art", a 1956 science fiction short story by James Blish

Other uses
 "Work of Art (Da Vinci)"  , a 2007 song by Måns Zelmerlöw
 Work of Art, an unreleased album by Deborah Cox
 Work of Art: The Next Great Artist, an American reality competition television show

See also

 Artwork (disambiguation)
 Work (disambiguation)
 Art (disambiguation)